Park Hee-young (or  ; born 11 June 1985) is a South Korean football player.

International goals

Career
In October 2009, she was loan return from SC 07 Bad Neuenahr in Fußball-Bundesliga.

Honours

Team 
Korea Republic
EAFF Women's Football Championship : 2005

Individual 
 Windsorawards Korea Football Award - Best Eleven (FW) : 2008

References

External links 

1985 births
Living people
South Korean women's footballers
South Korea women's under-20 international footballers
South Korea women's international footballers
Women's association football forwards
SC 07 Bad Neuenahr players
WK League players
South Korean expatriate footballers
Expatriate footballers in Germany
South Korean expatriate sportspeople in Germany
Asian Games medalists in football
Footballers at the 2006 Asian Games
Footballers at the 2010 Asian Games
Asian Games bronze medalists for South Korea
Medalists at the 2010 Asian Games
People from Taebaek
Sportspeople from Gangwon Province, South Korea